Enzo G. Baldoni (October 8, 1948 – August 26, 2004) was an Italian journalist working freelance and for the Italian news magazine Diario before being kidnapped and killed in captivity as captured on video by his captors. Baldoni was one of two Italians kidnapped in Iraq.

Personal
Baldoni was born in Città di Castello, Umbria. He had arrived in Baghdad a few weeks before his kidnapping and death, and also served there as a Red Cross volunteer. He was married with two children.

Career
Baldoni had started his career in diverse jobs including working as a mason (in Belgium), a gymnastics professor, photographer, interpreter and laboratory technician. He then moved into advertising, working for the advertising agency Le balene colpiscono ancora ("The whales strike again"). Finally, he became a freelance journalist. He was also a translator, and was responsible for the Italian translation of Doonesbury comic strips.

Kidnapping and death
He was kidnapped near Najaf, Iraq, 19 August 2004 by the "Islamic Army in Iraq", a Muslim fundamentalist terrorist organization, allegedly linked with Al-Qaeda. His driver-interpreter was killed during the abduction. The Islamic Army released a videotape, aired on August 24 by Al Jazeera, in which it threatened to kill Baldoni unless Italian troops were withdrawn from Iraq within 48 hours. On August 26, Al Jazeera came into possession of a videotape depicting Baldoni's murder. This videotape was not aired because of its gruesome nature. The existence of this tape is based on claims made by Al Jazeera only. Other sources claim it is only a video frame or a still shot taken with a digital camera.

See also
List of kidnappings

References

External links
 Diario
 Press freedom groups condemn killing - IFEX

1948 births
2004 deaths
20th-century Italian journalists
21st-century Italian journalists
20th-century Italian translators
Filmed assassinations
People from Città di Castello
Foreign hostages in Iraq
Journalists killed while covering the Iraq War
Italian people taken hostage
Assassinated Italian journalists
Italian war correspondents
Italian male journalists